Zgornji Gasteraj is a settlement in the Municipality of Sveti Jurij v Slovenskih Goricah in northeastern Slovenia. The area is part of the traditional region of Styria. The municipality is now included in the Drava Statistical Region.

A small roadside chapel-shrine in the settlement dates to 1910.

References

External links
Zgornji Gasteraj at Geopedia

Populated places in the Municipality of Sveti Jurij v Slovenskih Goricah